Avi Silberschatz (born in Haifa, Israel) is an Israeli computer scientist and researcher. He graduated in 1976 with a Ph.D. in computer science from the State University of New York (SUNY) at Stony Brook.  He became the Sidney J. Weinberg Professor of Computer Science at Yale University, USA in 2005. He was the chair of the Computer Science department at Yale from 2005 to 2011. Prior to coming to Yale in 2003, he was the Vice President of the Information Sciences Research Center at Bell Labs. He previously held an endowed professorship at the University of Texas at Austin, where he taught until 1993. His research interests include database systems, operating systems, storage systems, and network management. Silberschatz was elected an ACM Fellow in 1996 and received the Karl V. Karlstrom Outstanding Educator Award in 1998. 
He was elected an IEEE fellow in 2000 and received the IEEE
IEEE Taylor L. Booth Education Award in 2002 for " teaching, mentoring, and writing influential textbooks in the operating systems and database systems areas".
He was elected an AAAS fellow in 2009. Silberschatz
is a member of the Connecticut Academy of Science and Engineering.

His work has been cited over 34,000 times.

Books
 Operating System Concepts, 10th Edition, published in 2019 by Avi Silberschatz, Peter Galvin and Greg Gagne
 Operating System Concepts Essentials, 2nd Edition, published in 2013 by Avi Silberschatz, Peter Galvin and Greg Gagne
 Database System Concepts, 7th Edition, published in 2020 by Avi Silberschatz, Henry F. Korth and S. Sudarshan

References

External links
 

Yale University faculty
American computer scientists
Fellows of the Association for Computing Machinery
Fellow Members of the IEEE
Stony Brook University alumni
Living people
Year of birth missing (living people)